B. californica may refer to:

 Banksula californica, a harvestman species
 Bolandra californica, the Sierra bolandra or Sierra false coolwort, a flowering plant species endemic to the High Sierra Nevada of California
 Brickellia californica, the California brickellbush, a flowering plant species native to western North America from Baja California to Idaho to Oklahoma
 Brodiaea californica, the California brodiaea, a plant species native to California and Oregon

Synonyms
 Bassia californica, a synonym for Kochia californica, the rusty molly, a flowering plant species native to the valleys and deserts of southeastern California
 Bipolaris californica, a synonym for Cochliobolus sativus, a fungus species which is the causal agent of a wide variety of cereal diseases
 Bombycilaena californica, a synonym for Micropus californicus, the slender cottonweed, a plant species

See also
 List of Latin and Greek words commonly used in systematic names#C